The Castle of Castro Laboreiro is a Portuguese castle in civil parish of Castro Laboreiro, in the municipality of Melgaço. It is the ruins of a Romanesque castle with a belt of walls around a central keep with a cistern.

History

In the 9th century, Alfonso III of Asturias, donated the settlement of Castro Laboreiro and the castro to Count Hermenegildo, grandfather of Saint Rudesind, for his defeat of the Visigoth King of Hispania, Witiza. During the reign of the Galician count, the castro was adopted as a castle, but would eventually fall into the possession of the Moors.

In 1144, Afonso Henriques reconquered the redoubt, and from 1145 his forces began the task of restoring and expanding the defenses: it was Sancho I of Portugal who finally completed the project in the 12th century. The efforts were for not, as the Leonese raised the castle in 1212, during their invasion. In 1290, Denis of Portugal began the reconstruction, with emphasis on defense from its neighbors.

For many years Gomes de Abreu, of Merufe, was the alcalde of Laboreiro, and in 1375, King Fernando gave the alcaderia to Estevão Anes Marinho.

Following the conquest of Melgaço in the 14th century, King John used Castro Laboreiro to restrain various Castilian incursions from Galicia.

In 1441, the alcalde, Martim de Castro, was removed owing to protest from its residents.

From the designs of Duarte Darmas, the castle had, around 1506, five rectangular towers surrounding their central keep, which was preceded by the cistern in the north. Another, unidentified, construction was erected to the south.

In a surprise attack, Baltazar Pantoja took the castle after four hours of skirmishes in May 1666. He left Governor Pedro Esteves Ricarte in charge of the citadel, until it was retaken by the 3rd Count of Prado, Francisco de Sousa.

The King, citing its historical importance, decided to conserve the castle, in a response to his partner Michel Lescole, rather than deactivate it. Following the restoration of peace, in 1715, the castle was decommissioned.

From 1746 to 1779, the Governor of Castro Laboreiro was Manuel de Araújo Machado; the Count of Bobadela, then Governor-at-Arms for the Province, ordered the arrest of 400 men and women who had refused to present their children for military service in 1766-1778.

In 1801, troops occupied and defended the castle using four military pieces.

It has been listed as a National monument since 1944, but the first projects to maintain and restore the castle began in 1979, resulting in the re-pavement of the roadways, the removal of vegetation and landscaping, that continued into the following year. In 2005, the municipal council improved the access to the castle.

Architecture
It has an oval plan, oriented north-south, with the remains of the walls erected over cliffs and crags, sometimes zig-zagging, which corresponded to the ancient towers.

The principal entrance is the Gate of the Sun which opens to the east, while the "traitors' gate", the Gate of the Frog as it was known, in the north. The east-west courtyard is closed and accessible from a footbridge that was used to gather cattle and property during invasions. It is around these walls that ruins of the ancient cistern remain.

See also 

 Castle of Penedono
 Castle of Santo Estêvão

References

Notes

Sources 

 
 
 
 
 
 

Buildings and structures in Melgaço, Portugal
Castro Laoreiro
National monuments in Viana do Castelo District
Castro Laboreiro